Bush Bank is a hamlet partly in the civil parish of King's Pyon and partly in Birley with Upper Hill, in Herefordshire, England. It is on the A4110 road.

Hamlets in Herefordshire